Starston Wind Pump is a hollow post mill for pumping water, situated west of the village of Starston in Norfolk, England. The Pump is 330 yards away from the parish church of Saint Margaret in Mill Field. The windpump is a Grade II listed building and a scheduled ancient monument. After some years on the Heritage at Risk Register because of its poor condition, it was restored in 2010.

History
This unusual windmill pump was built c.1850 by the Suffolk Millwrights Whitmore and Binyon  and it was built to pump water from the nearby Beck to fill up massive water tanks, one on top of Starston Place house and one in the nearby farmyard of Home Farm. So efficient were the large canvas and wood sails of this little windmill, that although there was a stationary engine which could work the pumps, it was seldom used. However, with the installation a piped supply of water to the village and district the use of the pump was discontinued. The tank on top of the house provided the main supply of water for this very large house. The Farmyard tank supplied the water for the 200 head of milking cows and fattening bullocks on the farm, and also for the large herd of pigs that were also kept at Home Farm. Another use for this water was to maintain the level of water in the horse pond from an overflow pipe from the main tank.

References

Windmills completed in 1850
Infrastructure completed in 1850
Windmills in Norfolk
Post mills in the United Kingdom
Grade II listed buildings in Norfolk
Windpumps in the United Kingdom
Structures on the Heritage at Risk register
Scheduled monuments in Norfolk
Grade II listed windmills
South Norfolk